Maikave is a village in the Kozhikode district of Northern Kerala (Malabar), on average 4.1m above sea level and near a river. It is located near Thamarassery (about 7 km away). Maikave is a scenic little town due to its proximity to mountainous areas to the east. The nearest towns are Kodenchery, Thamarassery, Koodathai and Velamcode.

Village
Agriculture is the primary source of income in the area (rubber, arecanut, pepper and coconuts). The village has schools (St. Mary’s H.S., Koodathai & St. Georges H.S. Velamcode).

The famous St. Mary's Orthodox Church, Maikavu, St. Mary's Jacobite Syrian Church, Maikave and St. George Malankara Catholic Church are located here. Vattal Kurishu Palli is one of the major pilgrim centers.

Climate
Maikave has a humid climate with a very hot season extending from March to May. The main rainy season is during South West Monsoon, which starts in the first week of June and runs up to September. The North East Monsoon runs from the second half of October through to November. The average annual rainfall is 3266 mm. The best weather is found towards the end of the year, in December and January.

Festivals
Onam is the most famous festival of Kerala. It falls in the Malayalam month of Chingam (Aug-Sept). It is the harvest festival of Kerala.
Christmas
പള്ളിപ്പെരുന്നാള്] (Feast of St.Mary) is the local village festival, held on 14 January (ബാവ പള്ളിയില്) and 15 (മെത്രാന് പള്ളിയില്).
Easter

History
ദൈവത്തിന്റെ സ്വന്തം നാട്ടിലെ ഒരു കൊച്ചു സ്വർഗ്ഗം...മലനിരകൾക്കും പച്ചപ്പിനും നടുവിലായി സ്ഥിതി ചെയ്യുന്ന മൈക്കാവ്‌. കോഴിക്കോട് നിന്നും 40 കിലോമീറ്റർ അകലെ സ്ഥിതി ചെയ്യുന്ന ഈ കൊച്ചു ഗ്രാമം ഇന്നും നശിച്ചിട്ടില്ലാത്ത ഗ്രാമീണതയ്ക്കു പേരു കേട്ട ഇടമാണ്. ചുറ്റും കാണുന്ന തെങ്ങിൻ തോട്ടങ്ങളും സുഗന്ധവ്യജ്ഞന കൃഷികളും ഒക്കെയായി തനിനാടൻ കാഴ്ചകൾ ഒരുക്കുന്ന മൈക്കാവ്‌. കോഴിക്കോട് ജില്ലയിലെ കോടഞ്ചേരി എന്ന മലയോര മേഖലാ പഞ്ചായത്തില്‍ കൂടത്തായി വില്ലേജില്‍ ആണ് ഈ ഗ്രാമം.

മൈക്കാവ്‌ എന്നു കേൾക്കുമ്പോൾ എന്താണ് ഇതിന്റെ അർഥം എന്നു ആലോചിക്കാത്തവർ ചുരുക്കമായിരിക്കും. പ്രാദേശികമായി ഇവിടെ അറിയപ്പെടുന്ന കഥയനുസരിച്ച് മയിലുകള്‍ കൂട്ടത്തോടെ വസിച്ചിരുന്ന ഒരു പ്രദേശമായിരുന്നു ഇവിടം എന്നും, അതിനാല്‍ മയില്‍ കാവ് എന്ന് വിളിക്കപ്പെട്ടിരുന്നു എന്നും, പിന്നേ ആ പേര് ലോപിച്ച് മൈക്കാവ്‌ എന്ന പേര് ആയി മാറി എന്നും പറയപ്പെടുന്നു  

മലബാർ കുടിയേറ്റം: അതിജീവനത്തിന്റെ നേര്‍വഴികള്‍
 
1940 കളിലാണ് മദ്ധൃതിരുവിതാംകൂറില് നിന്ന് മലബാറിലെ താമരശ്ശേരി പ്രദേശങ്ങളിലേക്കു കർഷകരുടെ നിരന്തരപ്രവാഹം തുടങ്ങിയത്. ഇവരിലേറെയും കൃസ്ത്യാനികളായിരുന്നു. ഇരുപതാം നൂറ്റാണ്ടോടെ തിരുവിതാംകൂറിൽ ഉടലെടുത്ത ജനസംഖ്യാ വർദ്ദനവും, അതനുസരിച്ചുള്ള കൃഷിഭൂമിയുടെ ദൗർലഭ്യവും സാധാരണക്കാരായ ജനങ്ങളിൽ പട്ടിണിക്കും ദാരിദ്ര്യത്തിനും കാരണമായി. അങ്ങനെ നാട്ടിൽ നിൽക്കക്കളിയില്ലാതായ സാധാരണക്കാർ ബ്രിട്ടീഷ് സർക്കാരിന്റെ കീഴിലായിരുന്ന മലബാറിലെ മലയോര പ്രദേശങ്ങളിൽ കുടിയേറുന്നതിനേ കുറിച്ച് ചിന്തിച്ചു. നാട്ടിലെ തുണ്ട് ഭൂമി വിറ്റ് ആ പണം കൊണ്ട് തുഛമായാ വിലക്ക് മലബാറിൽ കൂടുതൽ ഭൂമി വാങ്ങി കൃഷി ചെയ്ത് ജീവിതം കെട്ടിപ്പടുക്കുക എന്നതായിരുന്നു ഇതിലെ ലക്ഷ്യം. മലബാറിലെ ഉദാരമായ ഭൂനിയമത്തിന്റെ ആനുകൂല്യവും, തിരുവിതാംകൂർ സർക്കാരിന്റെ പ്രോത്സാഹനവും ഇക്കാര്യത്തിൽ ഉണ്ടായിരുന്നു. മദ്ധൃതിരുവിതാംകൂറിൽ താരതമ്യേന ജനപ്പെരുപ്പം കൂടുതലായിരിക്കേ മലബാറിലെ മലമ്പ്രദേശങ്ങളും കാടുകളും ആർക്കും വേണ്ടാതെ കിടന്നിരുന്നു. മിക്ക സ്ഥലങ്ങലും ജന്മി കുടുംബങ്ങളുടെ ജന്മസ്വത്തായിരുന്നു. കാരൃസ്ഥൻമാരാണ് അവിടെ ഭരണവും ചൂഷണവും നടത്തിയത്. ചുരുങ്ങിയ വിലയ്ക്ക് ഏക്കറുകളായി ഭൂമി പതിച്ചു കൊടുക്കുന്നുവെന്ന വാർത്ത കാട്ടുതീ പോലെ മദ്ധൃതിരുവിതാംകൂറിൽ പരന്നു. തങ്ങളുടെ വീടും പാടവും വിറ്റ് കാർഷികോപകരണങ്ങളും ഗ്രഹോപകരണങ്ങളുമായി സ്ത്രീകളും കുട്ടികളുമായി അവർ മലബാറിലേക്കു തീവണ്ടി കയറി. ഏജന്റുമാർ വഴി കാരൃസ്ഥന്മാരെ സമീപിച്ചു. അവർ കാണിച്ചുകൊടുത്ത ഭൂമി വാങ്ങി കൃഷി ചെയ്യാനൊരുങ്ങി. ചേട്ടന്മാർ എന്നാണ് നാട്ടുകാർ ഇവരെ വിളിച്ചത്.

40കൾ മുതൽ ഇപ്രകാരം ചെറിയ തോതിൽ കുടിയേറ്റം താമരശ്ശേരി ഭാഗത്തേക്ക്  ആരംഭിച്ചു. വെറുതേ കിടന്നിരുന്ന വനസമാനമായ പ്രദേശങ്ങളിലും കുന്നിൻ പ്രദേശങ്ങളിലും അവർ പ്രാദേശിക നാടുവാഴികളുടെ കയ്യിൽ നിന്നും തുഛമായ വിലയിൽ രണ്ടും മൂന്നും ഏക്കർ സ്ഥലം വാങ്ങുകയും പാട്ടത്തിനെടുകുകയും ചെയ്തു. ആദ്യകാലങ്ങളിൽ കുടിയേറിയ കുടുംബങ്ങളെ സംബന്ധിച്ച് തീർത്തും വിജനമായ ചുറ്റുപാടിൽ ആയിരുന്നു ജീവിതം. കാട് വെട്ടിതെളിക്കലും നിലമൊരുക്കലുമെല്ലാം വന്യമൃഗങ്ങളുടെ മുരൾച്ചയും ചിന്നം വിളിയും കേട്ടുകൊണ്ടായിരുന്നു. നാട്ടിൽ നിന്നും ചാക്കിൽ കൊണ്ടുവന്ന ഉണക്കക്കപ്പ കഴിച്ചവർ വിശപ്പടക്കി. എങ്കിലും ഇതിലൊന്നും മനസ്സ് മടുക്കാതെ അതിൽ പതറാതെ അവിടം വെട്ടിത്തെളിച്ച് കൃഷിയോഗ്യമാക്കുന്നതിൽ അവർ വിജയിയ്ക്കുക തന്നെ ചെയ്തു. മനുഷ്യന്റെ അതിജീവനത്തിനു വേണ്ടിയുള്ള പോരട്ടങ്ങളുടെ ചരിത്രമെടുത്താൽ ചെറുതല്ലാത്ത ഒരു സ്ഥാനം ഇവർ വന്യമൃഗങ്ങളോടും രോഗങ്ങളോടും പടപൊരുതിനേടിയ ഈ വിജയത്തിനുണ്ട്. മലമ്പനി വന്ന് കുടുംബാംങ്ങൾ പലരും മരണപ്പെടുന്നത് നിസഹായതോടെ നോക്കിനിൽക്കേണ്ടി വരിക നിത്യ സംഭവമായിരുന്നു. പലർക്കും ഒറ്റജോടി വസ്ത്രം മാത്രമായിരുന്നു ഉണ്ടായിരുന്നത്.

പിന്നീട്  മുൻഗാമികളുടെ വിജയഗാഥ കേട്ടറിഞവർ കുടുംബത്തോടെ തിരുവിതാംകൂറിൽ നിന്നും സ്ഥലവും വിറ്റു പെറുക്കി കൂട്ടംകൂട്ടമായി കോഴിക്കോടു ലക്ഷ്യമാക്കി തീവണ്ടി കയറി. ഇതിനൊപ്പം വൻകിടക്കാരായ പ്ലാന്റർമാരും ഇവിങ്ങളിൽ സ്ഥലം സ്വന്തമാക്കി റബറും മറ്റും കൃഷി ആരംഭിച്ചു.
ആദ്യമാദ്യം വന്നവർ കിഴക്കൻ മലയോര മേഘലകളിലേക്ക് ബസ്സിലും തോണികളിലും കാളവണ്ടിയിലും നടന്നുമൊക്കെയായി എത്തിപ്പെട്ടവർ ആയിരുന്നു. മലബാറിലെ ഫൃൂഡല് സമൂഹത്തിന്റെ നടുക്ക് ഒരു കൃാപ്പിറ്റലിസ്റ്റ് സംസ്കാരവുമായി കുടിയേറ്റക്കാർ ജീവിതമാരംഭിച്ചു. വികസനം എന്ന വാക്ക് പിന്നീടാണു പ്രചാരം നേടിയതെങ്കിലും അതിന്റെ തിരികൊളുത്തിയത് ഇവരാണ്. അതിവേഗത്തിൽ മലമ്പനിയും കാട്ടാനകളും വഴിമാറി. കാട് നാടായിത്തീര്‍ന്നു. നാട്ടിനുള്ളിൽ നഗരങ്ങളുടെ കൊച്ചു പതിപ്പുകളുണ്ടായി.ഈ കുടിയേറ്റത്തിന്റെ ഫലമായി പ്രദേശങ്ങള്‍ ഉണർന്നു. നൂറ്റണ്ടുകളായി പാഴായിക്കിടന്ന മലമ്പ്രദേശങ്ങളിൽ പാതകളുടെയും പാലങ്ങളുടെയും പണിനടന്നു. ആധുനികയുഗത്തിന്റെ ഇരമ്പം ലോറികളിലൂടെ അവിടെ കടന്നു ചെന്നു. ജലസേചനപദ്ധതികളും തടയണകളും പത്രങ്ങളും അവിടെ സ്ഥാനം പിടിച്ചു. വൻകിട മുതലാളിമാരും തോട്ടക്കാരുമുണ്ടായി. മറ്റു മതക്കാരുമെത്തി. സർക്കാരിന്റെ ഓഫീസുകളും, ബാങ്കുകളും കോടതികളും സജീവമായി - ഒരു പ്രൈമറി സ്കൂൾ പോലും ഇല്ലാതിരുന്നിടത്ത് കോളേജുകളും ആശുപത്രികളും ഉയര്‍ന്നു. 
60 കളുടെ അവസാനത്തോടെ വിദ്യാഭ്യാസം നേടിയ തലമുറ വളർന്ന് വന്നതും കൃഷിക്ക് പുറമേയുള്ള ധാരാളം തൊഴിലവസരങ്ങൾ ഉപയോഗപ്പെടുത്തി തുടങ്ങുകയും മലബാർ മലയോരങ്ങൾ കുടിയേറ്റം വഴി വികസിച്ചതോടെ തുഛമായ വിലക്ക് അവിടെ ഭൂമി ലഭിക്കും എന്ന അവസ്ഥയും ഇല്ലാതാവുകയും 70 കളിൽ യുവാക്കളെ സംബന്ധിച്ച് പ്രവാസം കൂടുതൽ തൊഴിൽ സാധ്യതകൾ നൽകുകയും ചെയ്തതോടെ അമ്പത് വർഷം നീണ്ട കുടിയേറ്റയുഗത്തിന്റെ അന്ത്യമായി.

മൈക്കാവിന്റെ കുടിയേറ്റ ചരിത്രം

1939 - ൽ രണ്ടാം ലോകമഹായുദ്ധം ആരംഭിച്ച കാലഘട്ടത്തിൽ ബ്രിട്ടീഷുകാരെ സഹായിച്ച ഇന്ത്യൻ ജനത യുദ്ധത്തിന്റെ കെടുതികളിൽ ആവുകയും ഭാവിയിൽ വന്നേക്കാവുന്ന ഭക്ഷ്യ ലഭ്യതയെപ്പറ്റി ആകുല പെടുകയും,  അതിൽനിന്ന് മുക്തി നേടുവാൻ പുതിയ മേച്ചിൽപ്പുറങ്ങൾ ആവശ്യമാണെന്ന് ചിന്തിക്കുകയും,  വികസനത്തിൽ പിന്നോക്കം നിന്ന മലബാർ മേഖലയുടെ ഫലഭൂയിഷ്ടമായ കിഴക്കൻ മലയോര ഗ്രാമങ്ങളിലേക്ക് പലായനം ചെയ്യപ്പെടുകയും  ചെയ്തു.

ക്രിസ്ത്യൻ കുടിയേറ്റത്തെ പ്രധാനമായും രണ്ടായി കാണാം . സാമ്പത്തിക ഉന്നതിക്കായി എസ്റ്റേറ്റുകൾ സ്ഥാപിക്കാനുള്ള സമ്പന്നന്മാരുടെ കുടിയേറ്റവും, ജീവിതവൃത്തിക്ക് കുടുംബത്തിന്റെ പട്ടിണി അകറ്റാനുള്ള നെട്ടോട്ടമായി മലബാറിലേക്ക് യാത്രതിരിച്ച സാധാരണക്കാരന്റെ  യാത്രയും. 
ഇതുപോലെ തന്നെ തിരുവിതാംകൂറിൽ നിന്നുള്ള കുടിയേറ്റവും  പ്രധാനമായി രണ്ടു ദേശങ്ങളിൽ നിന്നായിരുന്നു.  ഇന്നത്തെ എറണാകുളം ജില്ല ഉൾപ്പെടുന്ന വടക്കൻ തിരുവിതാംകൂറിൽ നിന്നുള്ള യാക്കോബായ ക്രിസ്ത്യാനികളും, ഇന്നത്തെ കോട്ടയം ജില്ല ഉൾപ്പെടുന്ന തെക്കൻ തിരുവിതാംകൂറിൽ നിന്നുള്ള കത്തോലിക്കാ വിഭാഗവും. ഇവരെ പൊതുവായി വടക്കൻ തെക്കൻ എന്ന് വിളിച്ചു വേർതിരിച്ചു വന്നിരുന്നു. വടക്കരെ അപേക്ഷിച്ച തെക്കർ  വിദ്യാഭ്യാസത്തിലും സാമ്പത്തിക സ്ഥിതിയിലും  മുമ്പിലായിരുന്നു. അവരുടെ യാത്ര സാമ്പത്തിക ഉന്നതിക്കായിരുന്നെങ്കിൽ   ആദ്യകാല കുടിയേറ്റക്കാരായ വടക്കരിൽ  മിക്കവരും  ജീവിതാവസ്ഥ നിലനിർത്തുവാനുള്ള നെട്ടോട്ടത്തിലായിരുന്നു.

വടക്കൻ മലബാറിലെ വിദ്യാഭ്യാസ സൗകര്യങ്ങൾ വളരെ കുറഞ്ഞ സാഹചര്യത്തിലായിരുന്നു. മിക്കവാറും ഏകാധ്യാപക വിദ്യാലയങ്ങൾ (ആശാൻ പള്ളിക്കൂടങ്ങൾ) മാത്രമായിരുന്നു ഗ്രാമങ്ങളിൽ ലഭ്യമായിരുന്നത്. മലയാള എഴുത്തും അടിസ്ഥാന ഗണിതങ്ങളും മാത്രമാണ് അവിടെ അഭ്യസിച്ചിപ്പി രുന്നത്. ഇതിനാൽ ആവാം കുടിയേറ്റക്കാർ ആരാധനാലയങ്ങളും വിദ്യാഭ്യാസ സ്ഥാപനങ്ങളും  കുടിയേറ്റത്തോടൊപ്പം നിർമ്മിക്കാൻ നിർബന്ധിതരായത്. പിന്നീടുള്ള കുടിയേറ്റക്കാർ ഈ സൗകര്യങ്ങളുള്ള സ്ഥലങ്ങൾ തിരഞ്ഞെടുത്തു  താമസമാക്കുവാനും ശ്രമിച്ചു. 
മലബാറിലുള്ള,  പ്രത്യേകിച്ച് ഇന്നത്തെ കോഴിക്കോട്,  കണ്ണൂർ ജില്ലകളിലെ മലയോര പ്രദേശങ്ങളും വയനാട് ജില്ലയിൽ ഉൾപ്പെടുന്ന പ്രദേശങ്ങളും  പഴശ്ശിരാജാവിന്റെ  അധീനതയിലുള്ള കോട്ടയം രാജവംശത്തിനു കീഴിലായിരുന്നു.  ഈ സ്ഥലങ്ങളുടെ ക്രയവിക്രയ അവകാശം പ്രാദേശികമായ ചില നായർ, മേനോൻമാരെ ഏൽപ്പിച്ചിരുന്നു അവരിൽ നിന്നാണ് കുടിയേറ്റക്കാർ സ്ഥലം വാങ്ങിയിരുന്നത്. കൂടത്തായി ദേശം പ്രാദേശികമായ മുസ്ലിം ജന്മികളുടെ കൈവശമായിരുന്നു. അവർ കൃഷിയും കച്ചവടവും നടത്തി നല്ല സാമ്പത്തിക നിലയിലായിരുന്നു. കൂടത്തായിൽ നിന്നുള്ള മലയോര ഗ്രാമങ്ങൾ അവികസിതം ആയിരുന്നു. നമ്മുടെ മേഖലയിലെ കുടിയേറ്റം ആരംഭിക്കുന്നത് തന്നെ കൂടത്തായിയിൽ  നിന്നാണ്.

ഈ മേഖലയിലേക്കുള്ള ആദ്യകാല കുടിയേറ്റക്കാരിൽ പ്രമുഖർ പാലക്കാ തുരുത്തേൽ,  പുതിയാംപുറത്ത് എന്നീ കുടുംബക്കാരാണ്. ഇന്നത്തെ എറണാകുളം ജില്ലയിലുള്ള പിണ്ടിമന എന്ന സ്ഥലത്തുനിന്നുള്ള പാലക്കാതുരുത്തേൽ ഐപ്പ്, കറുകപ്പിള്ളിയിൽ നിന്നുള്ള പുതിയാംപുറത്ത് ഉലഹന്നാൻ  എന്നിവരാണ് 1942 -ൽ ഈ ദേശത്തെ ആദ്യകാല കുടിയേറ്റക്കാർ. കൂടത്തായിയിൽ നിന്ന് ഏകദേശം ഒരു കിലോമീറ്റർ കിഴക്കുമാറി അയാട്ടുതുരുത്തിക്കും ചമോറാക്കും ഇടയിലുള്ള ഫലഭൂയിഷ്ടമായ പാഠങ്ങളും ജല സൗകര്യമുള്ള നിരപ്പു നിലങ്ങളും അവർ സ്വായത്തമാക്കി വീതിച്ചെടുത്തു. പാലക്കാ തുരുത്തേൽ കുടുംബം ആദ്യമായി അവിടെ ഒരു വീട് വച്ചു. വിളക്കുമാടം എന്നാണ് അറിയപ്പെട്ടിരുന്നത്. ഒരു കെടാവിളക്കായി ആ കുടുംബം പിന്നീടുള്ള കുടിയേറ്റക്കാർക്ക് സഹായകമായി. പിന്നീടുള്ള കുടിയേറ്റക്കാർ വിളക്കുമാടത്തിൽ  ആണ് ആദ്യമായി എത്താറുള്ളത് അവിടെ താമസിച്ചു സ്ഥലങ്ങൾ വാങ്ങി വീടു കെട്ടി മാറി  അവസ്ഥ ഭദ്രം ആക്കിയിരുന്നു.

References

 
Villages in Kozhikode district
Thamarassery area